Karakat is an aul in the Turar Ryskulov District, Jambyl Region, Kazakhstan.

Demographics 

As of 1999, Karakat had a population of 779 people (396 men and 383 women).

References 

Populated places in Jambyl Region